All Saints’ Church, Kirk Hallam is a Grade I listed parish church in the Church of England in Kirk Hallam, Derbyshire.

History
The church dates from the 14th century. The nave was restored by George Edmund Street when new buttresses were added, a new porch constructed, the south wall was underpinned, the pews removed and replaced with open seating, the tower arch opened up, and the floor paved with Minton tiles. The church reopened on 21 August 1859.

Organ
The pipe organ was built by Charles Lloyd and Co and dedicated by the Bishop of Derby on 7 May 1904. A specification of the organ can be found on the National Pipe Organ Register.

See also
Grade I listed churches in Derbyshire
Grade I listed buildings in Derbyshire
Listed buildings in Ilkeston

References

Book
A history of Kirk Hallam village & church by Esther Collingham 2019 

Church of England church buildings in Derbyshire
Grade I listed churches in Derbyshire